León railway station is the railway station of the Spanish city of León.

History
The station was opened in 2011 in place of the old Estación del Norte.

Services
León station is an important junction in the Spanish rail network, currently the terminus of the Madrid–León high-speed rail line, with services to Madrid Chamartín via Palencia and Valladolid. Alvia services are operated to A Coruña, Barcelona Sants, Gijón and Vitoria-Gasteiz. The Regional Express service goes to Santiago de Compostela and Vigo-Guixar.

References

Railway stations in Castile and León
Buildings and structures in León, Spain